Chione erosa is an extinct species of bivalve in the family Veneridae. They are found from the late Pliocene to the Pleistocene of Florida, South Carolina, and North Carolina.

References
 https://neogeneatlas.net/species/chione-erosa/

Prehistoric bivalves
Veneridae